Ma'mar ibn Rashid was an eighth-century hadith scholar. A Persian mawla ("freedman"), he is cited as an authority in all six of the canonical Sunni hadith collections.

Life 
Ma'mar ibn Rashid was born in 96 AH/714 CE in Basra. He was a Persian mawla ("freedman") of the Huddan clan of Azd, trading cloth and other luxuries on their behalf. Despite this, he was able to study under the Basran scholars Hasan al-Basri and Qatada ibn Di'ama.

While on a journey to trade wares at Hisham ibn Abd al-Malik's court in Resafa, he encountered and became pupil to the elderly scholar Ibn Shihab al-Zuhri. Ma'mar learned and transmitted a large body of traditions from al-Zuhri through audition, public recitation and writing, making his narrations coveted by other hadith scholars.

Ma'mar remained in Resafa after al-Zuhri's death, and witnessed the removal of his late teacher's manuscripts from the Umayyad court following the assassination of al-Walid II. Amid the turbulence of the civil wars that followed, Ma'mar departed for Yemen where he married a local woman and taught several students. The most prominent of these was ʽAbd al-Razzaq al-Sanʽani, who he taught for the final seven to eight years of his life. ʽAbd al-Razzaq preserved Ma'mar's traditions in his own musannaf, notably arranging those concerning Muhammad's life into The Book of Expeditions, which has survived as one of the earliest extant works of sira-maghazi literature. Also preserved is ʽAbd al-Razzaq's recension of Ma'mar's hadith collection, al-Jāmi'''.

 See also 

 Ibn Jurayj
 Ata ibn Abi Rabah

 Bibliography 

 Rāshid, Maʿmar ibn, et al. The Expeditions: An Early Biography of Muhammad''. Edited by Sean W. Anthony, NYU Press, 2015.

References 

8th-century Muslim scholars of Islam
Hadith scholars
Iranian historians of Islam
Taba‘ at-Tabi‘in hadith narrators
8th-century Iranian people
8th-century historians of the medieval Islamic world